The mixed doubles tournament of the 2017 BWF World Championships (World Badminton Championships) took place from 21 to 27 August.

Seeds

  Zheng Siwei / Chen Qingchen (final)
  Lu Kai / Huang Yaqiong (quarterfinals)
  Tontowi Ahmad / Liliyana Natsir (champion)
  Zhang Nan / Li Yinhui (third round)
  Chris Adcock / Gabby Adcock (semifinals)
  Joachim Fischer Nielsen / Christinna Pedersen (third round)
  Praveen Jordan / Debby Susanto (quarterfinals)
  Tan Kian Meng / Lai Pei Jing (third round)

  Choi Sol-gyu / Chae Yoo-jung (third round)
  Lee Chun Hei / Chau Hoi Wah (semifinals)
  Kenta Kazuno / Ayane Kurihara (third round)
  Tang Chun Man / Tse Ying Suet (quarterfinals)
  Wang Yilyu / Huang Dongping (quarterfinals)
  Mathias Christiansen / Sara Thygesen (third round)
  Pranav Chopra / N. Sikki Reddy (third round)
  Yuta Watanabe / Arisa Higashino (second round)

Draw

Finals

Section 1

Section 2

Section 3

Section 4

External links
Draw

2017 BWF World Championships
World Championships